Eligius Tambornino (born 25 October 1986) is a Swiss cross-country skier who has been competing since 2003.

At the FIS Nordic World Ski Championships 2009 in Liberec, Tambornino finished 21st in the individual sprint event. At the 2010 Winter Olympics in Vancouver, he finished 11th in the team sprint event and 49th in the individual sprint events. His best World Cup finish was fourth at a team sprint event in Germany in 2009 while his best individual finish was tenth in an individual sprint event at Switzerland in 2008.

He later switched to biathlon, making his World Cup debut in 2017.

References

1986 births
Cross-country skiers at the 2010 Winter Olympics
Living people
Olympic cross-country skiers of Switzerland
Swiss male cross-country skiers
Swiss male biathletes